The SoHo Weekly News (also called the SoHo News) was a weekly alternative newspaper published in New York City from 1973 to 1982. The paper was founded in 1973 by Michael Goldstein (1938–2018).

History
The first issue was published on October 11, 1973.  Initially published in eight pages, it eventually grew to over 100 pages and competed with The Village Voice.  The paper's offices were at 111 Spring Street, Manhattan, although the earliest issues showed the address of Goldstein's apartment on the masthead. Circulation was reported as 25,000 – 30,000.

The paper was sold to Associated Newspaper Group (ANG) in 1979.  In the fall of 1981, ANG announced plans to close or sell the paper by February 1982.  Although there were negotiations with possible purchasers, which continued beyond the original deadline, continuing losses ($1.7 million in the previous year) forced ANG to shut down the paper in March.  The recent unionization of the paper was cited a factor in the decision.

The last issue dated March 10–16, 1982 had 40,000 copies printed.

Influence and style
Three years after it was launched, The New York Times reported that the SoHo Weekly News was the second largest English-language weekly in the city, was being positioned as a direct competitor of The Village Voice, and was sold at 400 newsstands in New York City.

After the paper shut down, the New York Times ran an op-ed which called the SoHo News the "alternative to alternative papers".  The paper's contributors were described as an eccentric mix of "neo-conservatives and Marxists, radical feminists and hedonistic libertines, chronic potheads and antidrug crusaders".

The paper was an outspoken critic of the commercialization and gentrification of SoHo, the neighborhood where it was located and concentrated its coverage.  Topics covered included a review of East Village drug merchants; the piece described various brands of heroin and cocaine that were available, their street names, and commented on the relative quality.

Music and art coverage 
The SoHo News was known for its coverage of new musical artists in downtown New York.  In 1975, the SoHo Weekly News was one of the first papers to interview The Ramones.  In 1978, they ran an interview with the Talking Heads.

Gerald Marzorati was the arts editor. "Art Breakers: N.Y.'s Emerging Artists, Special Supplement," edited and with an introduction by Gerald Marzorati. (September 17-23, 1980) featured a cover story with photographs by Timothy Greenfield-Sanders. Julian Schnabel was the issue's cover. Other artists featured and photographed by Greenfield-Sanders include:  Donald Sultan, Christy Rupp, Sandy Skoglund, Helen Oji, David Hammons, Cindy Sherman, Bill Jensen, R.M. Fischer, Pedro Lujan, Rae Berolzheimer, Laurie Simmons, Ann Sperry, Len Jenshel, Howardina Pindell, Kathleen Agnoli and David Reed.

Self-mutilation event 
On November 26, 1979, 27-year-old Manhattan resident Henry Benvenuti walked into the SoHo Weekly News office and asked to see art editor Gerry Marzorati.  After being told he could not see Mr. Marzorati, Benvenuti took out a hatchet, stated that, "I'm doing this in the name of art," chopped off two of his fingers, and walked out of the office, leaving the fingers behind.  Benvenuti and his severed fingers were taken to Bellevue Hospital.  Doctors were unable to reattach the fingers.

Alumni 
Many SoHo News staff went on to have significant careers after the paper shut down.  Noteworthy alumni include:

 Sasha Anawalt, dance writer
 Richard Corliss, writer
Christopher Cox, writer, photographer, editor
 Danny Fields, columnist
 Annie Flanders, style editor
 Peter Frank, art critic
 Ralph Gardner Jr., writer
Timothy Greenfield-Sanders, photographer
Kim Hastreiter, style editor
 Cynthia Heimel, writer
 Ira Kaplan, music critic
Gerald Marzorati, art editor
 Michael Musto, writer
 Tim Page, news editor
 Jane Perlez, reporter
 John Perreault, art critic
 Bill Plympton, political cartoonist
 Charles Ruas, literary critic
 Jill Schary Robinson, writer
 Ken Tucker, freelance reviewer
 Judd Tully, art reviewer
 Bruce Weber, fashion photographer
 Ron Whyte, arts and book review editor
 Peter Zummo, music reviewer

References

External links 

 SoHo Weekly News – New York in the 70s, Allan Tannenbaum photo gallery

Alternative weekly newspapers published in the United States
1973 establishments in New York City
1982 disestablishments in New York (state)
Defunct newspapers published in New York City